The peso argentino was the currency of Argentina between June 1, 1983, and June 14, 1985. It was subdivided into 100 centavos. The symbol was $a. The ISO 4217 code was ARP.

History
The peso argentino replaced the peso ley at a rate of 1 peso argentino = 10,000 pesos ley. It was itself replaced by the austral at a rate of 1 austral = 1000 pesos argentinos.

Coins
In 1983, coins for 1, 5, 10 and 50 centavos were issued. In 1984, the 50 centavo was again issued, alongside 1, 5 and 10 pesos argentinos. In 1985, 5, 10 and 50 peso argentino coins were struck.

Centavo

Peso argentino

The 50-peso coins have the text Cincuentenario del Banco Central ("Central Bank fiftieth anniversary").

Banknotes
In June 1983, the Banco Central issued notes for 1, 5, 10, 50 and 100 pesos argentinos, based in modified plates of 1, 5, 10, 50 and 100 peso ley, were demonetized in 1981. These banknotes followed by 1000 pesos argentinos note in October. In 1984, 500 and 5000 peso argentino notes were introduced and old peso ley banknotes below 1 peso argentino were demonetized. In 1985, notes for 10,000 pesos argentinos were introduced.

When the austral was introduced (June 15, 1985), some 1000, 5000 and 10,000 peso argentino notes were overstamped with A 1 (1 austral), A 5 (5 australes) and A 10 (10 australes), respectively, and old peso ley banknotes were demonetized.

See also

La Década Perdida (The Lost Decade)
Latin American debt crisis

References

External links
 Official website of the Banco Central de la República Argentina (Central Bank of the Republic of Argentina)
 Pesos argentinos coin photos

Currencies of Argentina
Peso Argentino
1983 establishments in Argentina
1985 disestablishments
1980s economic history